Thiete is a heterocyclic compound containing an unsaturated four-membered ring with three carbon atoms and one sulfur atom. It is more commonly encountered not on its own, but in anellated derivatives, several of which have been synthesized. Thietes are generally not very stable.

Structure 
Thiete is a valence isomer of the compound thioacrolein (CH2=CHCH=S) and undergoes ring opening to it at temperatures below 400°C. Thiete has been shown to be planar, with a C-S-C angle of 76.8 degrees.

Derivatives
Benzothietes are thietes annulated to benzo group.  Such species are prepared by flash vacuum pyrolysis of 2-mercaptobenzyl alcohols.  They are precursors to other S-heterocycles.

Thiete 1,1-dioxides are sulfones, the parent being C3H4SO2. They are more stable than the parent thietes. Substituted thiete-1,1-dioxides can also be prepared by [2+2] cycloaddition of sulfenes and ynamines.

See also 

 Dithiete - analogue with two sulfur atoms

References 

Sulfur heterocycles
Four-membered rings